Donnie Lamont Sadler (born June 17, 1975) is an American former professional baseball utility player. He played in Major League Baseball (MLB) from 1998–2007.

Career
An alumnus of Valley Mills High School in Valley Mills, Texas (where he was an all-state shortstop), Sadler is small in stature, standing at only 5'6" tall and weighing 175 pounds. His cousin, Ray Sadler, is an outfielder in the Tampa Bay Rays organization.

He earned a spot on the Midwest League All-Star team in  because he not only stole 41 bases, he batted a respectable .283 with nine home runs and 55 RBI.

Sadler made his big league debut at the age of 23 in the second game of the  season, April 1. Although Sadlers' Red Sox beat the Oakland Athletics 2-0 that game, he went 0 for 3 at the plate.

After starting the season without collecting a single hit in his first 11 at bats, he was quickly sent down and did not see any Major League action until July of that year. The first hit of his career was quite impressive-it came in his second game after being recalled from Pawtucket in July-off of pitcher Jason Bere on July 3, he smacked a triple in the sixth inning. Although he finished the game one for five, he did help the Red Sox beat the Chicago White Sox 15 to 2-he scored one of the Red Sox' many runs in that game.

The rest of his career saw him bouncing up and down between the minors and majors, spending only one season in the majors for the entire year: .

Sadler was involved in a couple noteworthy transactions in his career. The first occurred on November 16, 2000, when he and Michael Coleman were sent to the Cincinnati Reds for Chris Stynes. The second came on June 20, 2001, when the Reds traded Sadler to the Kansas City Royals for minor league pitcher Cary Ammons.

Sadler finished with a career batting average of .202, and he ultimately did not show the speed he displayed in the minors-the highest total of stolen bases he  had in a season was seven. Oddly, of the six home runs he hit in his career, three of them came in the first 124 at bats of his career. He hit only three more in 643 at bats.

His postseason batting average was .500-he has collected one hit (a double) in two at bats.

On July 28, 2007, it was announced that Sadler had tested positive for "a drug of abuse" and was handed a 50-game suspension.

Sadler later served as a hitting coach for the Philadelphia Phillies organization.

Career Stats

References

External links

1975 births
Living people
Major League Baseball infielders
Major League Baseball outfielders
Baseball players from Texas
Boston Red Sox players
Cincinnati Reds players
Kansas City Royals players
Texas Rangers players
Arizona Diamondbacks players
Baseball players suspended for drug offenses
Gulf Coast Red Sox players
Trenton Thunder players
Pawtucket Red Sox players
Omaha Royals players
Oklahoma RedHawks players
Charlotte Knights players
Tucson Sidewinders players
People from Clifton, Texas
People from Valley Mills, Texas